The 2007 No Surrender was a professional wrestling pay-per-view (PPV) event produced by Total Nonstop Action Wrestling (TNA), which took place on September 9, 2007 at the TNA Impact! Zone in Orlando, Florida. It was the third event under the No Surrender chronology. Eight professional wrestling matches were featured on the event's card.  Kurt Angle defended all of the championships individually during this event.

In October 2017, with the launch of the Global Wrestling Network, the event became available to stream on demand. It would later be available on Impact Plus in May 2019.

Storylines
The event featured professional wrestling matches that involve different wrestlers from pre-existing scripted feuds and storylines. Professional wrestlers portray villains, heroes, or less distinguishable characters in the scripted events that build tension and culminate in a wrestling match or series of matches.

Event

The opening match of the pay-per-view saw the champions Kurt Angle and Sting defend their TNA World Tag Team Championship against Team Pacman (Adam "Pacman" Jones and Ron Killings). Team Pacman won the match and the championship when Jones pinned Sting after an Olympic Slam from Angle.

The second match saw Rhino defeat James Storm. Rhino picked up the victory when he pinned Storm after a Gore through a table. After the match, Rhino hit Jackie Moore, who came to the ring with Storm, with a Gore.

The next match saw Robert Roode defeat Kaz, when Roode pinned Kaz after The Payoff.

The TNA X Division Championship match was next. The match saw Kurt Angle in his second match of the evening, defending his title. Jay Lethal picked up the victory when Lethal pinned Angle by reversing an ankle lock into a roll-up.

The following match was a No Disqualification match between Chris Harris and Black Reign. Harris won after he pinned Black Reign with an inside cradle.

The next match was a ten-team tag team gauntlet match to earn a TNA World Tag Team Championship match at Bound for Glory. A.J. Styles and Tomko won when Styles pinned Sabin with a roll-up. The other teams in the match were The Voodoo Kin Mafia (B.G. James and Kip James), The Latin American Exchange (Hernandez and Homicide), Team 3D (Brother Ray and Brother Devon), The Motor City Machine Guns (Alex Shelley and Chris Sabin), Triple X (Christopher Daniels and Senshi), Sonjay Dutt and Petey Williams, Serotonin (Raven and Havok), Eric Young and Shark Boy and Rock 'n Rave Infection (Lance Hoyt and Jimmy Rave)

In the second to last match Christian Cage defeated Samoa Joe by disqualification. Joe was disqualified after attacking the referee when he tried to break up a hold. After the match, Joe continued to attack referees, security and X Division jobbers.

In the main event Kurt Angle defeated Abyss to retain the TNA World Heavyweight Championship, in Angle's third match of the evening. Angle forced Abyss to submit to the ankle lock. After the match, Judas Mesias cut a hole under the ring mat and pulled Abyss underneath.

Results

* The other teams were The Voodoo Kin Mafia (B.G. James and Kip James), The Latin American Exchange (Hernandez and Homicide), Team 3D (Brother Ray and Brother Devon), The Motor City Machine Guns (Alex Shelley and Chris Sabin), Triple X (Christopher Daniels and Senshi), Sonjay Dutt and Petey Williams, Serotonin (Raven and Havok), Eric Young and Shark Boy and Rock 'n Rave Infection (Lance Hoyt and Jimmy Rave)

See also
2007 in professional wrestling

References

Professional wrestling shows in Orlando, Florida
2007 in professional wrestling in Florida
Impact Wrestling No Surrender
September 2007 events in the United States
2007 Total Nonstop Action Wrestling pay-per-view events